Ali Al-Baghli (1 January 1947 – 26 February 2023) was a Kuwaiti politician. An independent, he served as Minister of Oil from 1992 to 1996.

Al-Baghli died of a heart attack in Kuwait City, on 26 February 2023, at the age of 76.

References

1947 births
2023 deaths
20th-century politicians
Kuwait University alumni
Members of the National Assembly (Kuwait)
Oil ministers of Kuwait
People from Kuwait City